Sacha Charles Julian Guy Bastien (born 22 January 1995) is a French professional footballer who plays as a goalkeeper.

Bastien started his career playing in the French Championnat National 3 for the respective reserve teams of CS Sedan Ardennes and Stade de Reims. He made his first-team debut for Reims in Ligue 1 in September 2014. He subsequently joined Bastia-Borgo at the start of the 2017–18 season, spending one year there before signing for US Granville of the Championnat National 2. Bastien signed for English League Two club Stevenage in August 2019 and spent the 2019–20 season there. He joined Gillingham of League One in January 2021 on a short-term contract, where he spent the remainder of the 2020–21 season. He returned to Stevenage in August 2021 and spent the 2021–22 season there.

Club career

France
Bastien began his career playing for the CS Sedan Ardennes reserve team in the Championnat National 3. He made his debut, aged 17, in a 1–1 draw with Grande Synthe on 25 August 2012. He made 15 appearances for the club's reserves during the 2012–13 season. The following season, Bastien joined Stade de Reims on 5 September 2013, and he spent his first year there playing for Reims' reserve team. He started for the first team in their Ligue 1 match against his hometown club FC Metz on 27 September 2014. Bastien picked up a thigh strain in the match and was subsequently replaced by Cyriak Garel in the 22nd-minute of the match.

Ahead of the 2017–18 season, Bastien signed for Bastia-Borgo of the Championnat National 2. He made three first-team appearances during the season, as well as making three further appearances for the Bastia-Borgo II team. The following season, Bastien joined US Granville, also competing in the Championnat National 2, and made 10 appearances for the club's first team during the season.

Stevenage
Bastien joined League Two club Stevenage on a free transfer on 2 August 2019. He made his Stevenage debut in the club's 3–0 EFL Trophy defeat to Milton Keynes Dons at Broadhall Way on 3 September 2019. Bastien signed a contract extension to remain at Stevenage for the rest of the season on 20 January 2020. He was released by the club in June 2020 having made four appearances.

Gillingham
Having been without a club since leaving Stevenage, Bastien went on trial at League One club Gillingham at the end of 2020. He trained with the club for "many weeks", playing in a number of the club's behind closed doors training matches. Gillingham manager Steve Evans stated he had always planned on offering Bastien a full-time contract following the trial, but was waiting for confirmation of Joe Walsh's departure to Queens Park Rangers. Bastien subsequently signed a contract for the remainder of the 2020–21 season on 29 January 2021. He was released by Gillingham upon the expiry of his contract, having made no first-team appearances.

Return to Stevenage
Ahead of the 2021–22 season, Bastien returned to former club Stevenage on trial. He subsequently signed for the club on 2 August 2021. He made two appearances during the season, before being released upon the expiry of his contract in July 2022.

Career statistics

References

External links

Living people
1995 births
French footballers
French expatriate footballers
Association football goalkeepers
Stade de Reims players
FC Bastia-Borgo players
US Granville players
Stevenage F.C. players
Gillingham F.C. players
Ligue 1 players
Championnat National 2 players
Championnat National 3 players
English Football League players
French expatriate sportspeople in England
Expatriate footballers in England
Footballers from Metz